Rosanna Zanetti (born on June 15, 1988 in Caracas, Venezuela), is a Venezuelan actress. She is best known for her roles in telenovelas ¡Qué clase de amor! where she landed her first starring role, Fanatikda where she was the protagonist, telenovela produced by TC Televisión, and Natalia del Mar where she was the youthful protagonist of the story.

Career 
Her first appearance in the world of acting was in the French film, 99 Francs, where she had a little special participation. In 2014, she landed her first role as a villain in the telenovela La virgen de la calle.

Filmography

Film

Television

References

External links 
 

Living people
1988 births
21st-century Venezuelan actresses
Venezuelan telenovela actresses
Actresses from Caracas
Venezuelan people of Italian descent